Airdrie railway station is a railway station serving the town of Airdrie, North Lanarkshire, Scotland.

History 
Opened by the Bathgate and Coatbridge Railway and absorbed into the North British Railway, it became part of the London and North Eastern Railway during the Grouping of 1923. The station then passed on to the Scottish Region of British Railways on nationalisation in 1948. British Railways then ran the station for Strathclyde PTE, and continued to do so as ScotRail when sectorisation was introduced, until the privatisation of British Rail.  The station became a terminus in January 1956, when passenger services to Bathgate over the former B&CR were withdrawn - freight over this line continued until final closure & abandonment in 1982. The line from Glasgow was subsequently wired as part of the North Clyde electrification scheme in 1960. Strathclyde PTE & BR reopened a short portion of the line eastwards to a new station at Drumgelloch in 1989 and full reinstatement of the line to Bathgate followed in 2010 (see below).

As part of the Airdrie-Bathgate rail link reopening, the station has been refurbished, including the reinstatement of the second through platform with a capability of holding 9 carriages opposite the current Platform 2, which has been extended and a large car park facility (see link in sources below).

Services

2008 

These called at Coatdyke, Coatbridge Sunnyside and Blairhill before running fast to High Street then at all stations to Milngavie.

Evenings and Sundays, the half-hourly Drumgelloch to Helensburgh Central service operated.

May 2010 to December 2010 
Following closure of the 1989 Drumgelloch station as part of the Airdrie to Bathgate project (which included the construction of a new station to the east of the 1989 station), a half-hourly bus service operated to and from the 1989 Drumgelloch station to connect with services arriving from Glasgow and Helensburgh.

From 12 December 2010 
Following the opening of the line between Airdrie and Bathgate, the basic off-peak daytime service is:
 2tph -  to/from 
 2tph -  to/from 
 2tph - Airdrie to/from 
The evening service is:
 2tph -  to/from 
The Sunday service is:
 2tph -  to/from

2016 

The daytime & Sunday service remains unchanged in the May 2016 timetable, but the evening service now runs to Balloch westbound rather than Milngavie (as well as to Helensburgh), whilst eastbound the Edinburgh service is half-hourly.

References

Notes

Sources 

 
 
 
 

Railway stations in North Lanarkshire
Former North British Railway stations
Railway stations in Great Britain opened in 1862
SPT railway stations
Railway stations served by ScotRail
1862 establishments in Scotland
Airdrie, North Lanarkshire